C. Perumal (died 18 July 2013) was an Indian politician of the All India Anna Dravida Munnetra Kazhagam party and incumbent member of the Tamil Nadu Legislative Assembly from the Yercaud constituency. He also served as a Member of the Parliament of India representing Tamil Nadu in the Rajya Sabha, the upper house of the Indian Parliament. He died from cardiac arrest on 18 July 2013.

References

External links
 Profile on Rajya Sabha website

Year of birth missing
2013 deaths
Rajya Sabha members from Tamil Nadu
All India Anna Dravida Munnetra Kazhagam politicians
Tamil Nadu MLAs 1991–1996